William Richard "Billy" Wilkerson (September 29, 1890 – September 2, 1962) was the founder of The Hollywood Reporter, a real estate developer in Las Vegas and owner of such nightclubs as Ciro's. His series of columns known as "Billy's List" helped to initiate the red scare that led to the Hollywood blacklist.

Personal life

Wilkerson was born in Nashville, Tennessee, on September 29, 1890. He began to study medicine in Philadelphia, Pennsylvania, but when his father died leaving extensive gambling debts, Wilkerson quit school to support himself and his mother. He became a compulsive gambler himself, but quit when his son was born in October 1951.

Wilkerson was in relatively poor health throughout the latter half of the 1950s due to decades of excessive smoking. He continued to head The Hollywood Reporter and write his daily "Tradeviews" column until shortly before his death. Wilkerson died of a heart attack on September 2, 1962, at his Bel-Air home, one day before The Hollywood Reporter′s 32nd anniversary. He is interred at Holy Cross Cemetery in Culver City.

Wilkerson was married six times. His wives were:
 Helen Durkin - probably around 1913 or 1914 - probably New York or Fort Lee, New Jersey - Durkin died in the Spanish Influenza Epidemic of 1918.
 Edith Gwynn Goldenhorn - June 22, 1927 - Los Angeles, CA - August 7, 1935 - Cd. Juárez, Mexico
 Rita Ann Seward - September 30, 1935 - Las Vegas - May 9, 1938 - Los Angeles, CA
 Estelle Jackson Brown - December 12, 1939 - Las Vegas, NV - August 13, 1942 - Reno, NV
 Vivian DuBois - May 9, 1946 - Las Vegas, NV - March 14, 1950 - Los Angeles, CA
 Beatrice Ruby Noble - February 23, 1951 - Phoenix, AZ - His death

Career

When a friend won a Fort Lee, New Jersey movie theater in a bet, Wilkerson agreed to manage it in exchange for half the profits. Expanding his work in the movie industry, he became district manager at Universal Pictures under Carl Laemmle.

The Hollywood Reporter

Wilkerson published the first issue of The Hollywood Reporter on September 3, 1930. He began each issue with a self-penned editorial entitled "Tradeviews", which proved highly influential.

In 1946, he began a series of columns in The Hollywood Reporter, listing suspected Communist sympathizers; "Billy's List" helped to initiate the "red scare" that led to the Hollywood blacklist.

Business ventures

Wilkerson opened a series of social nightspots on Los Angeles' Sunset Strip.  Seeing opportunities in Las Vegas, he made key investments there as well.

Restaurants, nightclubs, and hotels that Wilkerson started:
 Vendome Wine & Spirits Co. (1933)
 Cafe Trocadero (1934) 
 Sunset House (1936) (haberdashery & barbershop)
 The Arrowhead Springs Hotel (1939)
 Ciro's (1940)
 Restaurant La Rue (Sunset Strip) (1944)
 The Flamingo Hotel (1945) Wilkerson named the hotel, then began development and building of the property, but ran low of money. Bugsy Siegel soon moved in to help finish the hotel casino with mob financing, and Wilkerson eventually sold out his share to Siegel.
 L'Aiglon (1947)
 Club LaRue (of Las Vegas) (December 1950)

References

Further reading
 W.R. Wilkerson III The Man Who Invented Las Vegas (Ciro's Books Publishing, 2000 )
 W.R. Wilkerson III Hollywood Godfather: The Life and Crimes of Billy Wilkerson 2018

External links
William Wilkerson at Find A Grave
Early Vegas
Vegas and the Mob

1890 births
1962 deaths
People from Nashville, Tennessee
Businesspeople from Los Angeles
American magazine publishers (people)
Burials at Holy Cross Cemetery, Culver City
The Hollywood Reporter people
American casino industry businesspeople
Hollywood blacklist
20th-century American businesspeople